Eugène Bayon (27 November 1899 – 3 April 1941) was a French sprinter. He competed in the 400 m event at the 1920 Summer Olympics, but failed to reach the final.

References

1899 births
1941 deaths
French male sprinters
Olympic athletes of France
Athletes (track and field) at the 1920 Summer Olympics